The Vaad Ha'ir Synagogue is a synagogue in Montevideo, Uruguay. 

The construction of this temple started in 1944, it was consecrated in 1948. It used to have a rich religious life during its first decades.

See also
 List of synagogues in Uruguay

References

Synagogues in Montevideo
Centro, Montevideo
Synagogues completed in 1948
1947 establishments in Uruguay